The Internal Security Department (ISD) is a domestic counter-intelligence and security agency of Singapore under the purview of the Ministry of Home Affairs (MHA), tasked to confront and address security threats, including international terrorism, foreign subversion and espionage. It has the utmost right to detain without trial individuals suspected to be a threat to national security.

The ISD also monitors and addresses potential threats from communism, prevention of racial tension which might affect the public peace, domestic counter-terrorism, international counter-terrorism, fraud against the state, surveillance, apprehension of suspected militants or terrorists and protection of Singapore's national borders.

History
ISD was first established as part of the Special Branch in 1948 by the British colonial government. 

In 1963, it became part of the Malaysian Special Branch when Singapore merged with Malaysia, and after Singapore gained independence, the Internal Security Department was formally established on 17 February 1966. 

It was formerly part of the Ministry of Interior and Defence (MID) until it was split on 11 August 1970. In 2004, it was placed under the National Security Coordination Secretariat to improve intelligence sharing with other national intelligence agencies.

Legislation
The powers of investigation and arrest of the ISD are regulated by several laws, including:
 Criminal Procedure Code
 Official Secrets Act
 Internal Security Act
 Maintenance of Religious Harmony Act

Timeline

These events are related to ISD and internal security of Singapore.

 1950, Maria Hertogh riots.
 1963, arrest of left-wing politicians and trade unionists during Operation Coldstore.
 1964, 21 July – 8 September, race riots, took place on Muhammad's birthday.
 1965, 10 March, MacDonald House bombing by Indonesian saboteurs killed three people, during the konfrontasi period.
 1966, arrest of 22 members of Barisan Sosialis.
 1969, communal clashes spillover from the 13 May incident.
 1974, 31 January, Laju incident, the Japanese Red Army bombed petroleum tanks at Pulau Bukom and hijacked a ferry boat.
 1982, uncovered Singapore People's Liberation Organisation activities.
 1982, two Soviet spies, Anatoly Alexeyevich Larkin and Alexander Alexandrovich Bondarev, exposed for espionage activities.
 1985, local network of Liberation Tigers of Tamil Eelam uncovered.
 1987, arrest of 22 alleged pro-Marxist activists during Operation Spectrum.
 1991, four Pakistanis hijacked Singapore Airlines Flight 117.
 1997, 1998, six arrested for involvement in espionage and foreign subversive activities.
 2001, 9 December, members of Jemaah Islamiyah (JI) arrested for bomb plots on the American, Australian, British and Israeli embassies.
 2008, 27 February, Mas Selamat bin Kastari, alleged leader of JI's Singapore branch, escaped while under the ISD's custody.
 2009, 1 April, the Malaysian authorities captured Mas Selamat in Skudai, Johor.
 2010, 8 February, the ISD summoned Pastor Rony Tan of Lighthouse Evangelism over video clips posted on the church website that were deemed 'highly inappropriate and unacceptable' as they "trivialised and insulted the beliefs of Buddhists and Taoists".
 2021, 27 January, the ISD reported it had arrested a 16-year old Protestant youth under the Internal Security Act in November 2020 for plotting to attack two Singaporean mosques on the anniversary of the 2019 Christchurch mosque shootings. The youth had written a manifesto praising the perpetrator Brenton Tarrant as a "saint" and describing the Christchurch mosque shootings as the "justifiable killing of Muslims." The teenage is the youngest person and the first far right extremist to be detained under the ISA.
 2021, 29 January, Yeo Jun Wei, was detained by the ISD for investigations into engaging in "activities prejudicial to Singapore’s security".
 2021, 10 March, the ISD reported that it had detained  a 20-year old national serviceman named Amirull Ali in February 2021 under the Internal Security Act for plotting to attack three Jewish worshippers at the Maghain Aboth Synagogue out of sympathy for the Palestinians. Ali also reportedly planned to travel to Gaza to join Hamas' military wing, the Izz ad-Din al-Qassam Brigades.

Directors
The following is a list of former Director of the Internal Security Department. The identity of the director is not conspicuously made known to the public, until they relinquish the post.

See also

 Security and Intelligence Division, the foreign intelligence service
 Security Service (MI5), British counterpart
 Federal Bureau of Investigation (FBI), American counterpart

References

Further reading 

Lee Kuan Yew. (1998). The Singapore Story. Federal Publications. 
Mathew Jones, "Creating Malaysia: Singapore Security, the Borneo Territories and the Contours of British Policy, 1961–1963" in Journal of Imperial and Commonwealth History, Vol. 28, No. 2, May 2000. pp. 85–109

External links

 Internal Security Department

Counterterrorism in Singapore
Organisations of the Singapore Government
Law enforcement agencies of Singapore
Singaporean intelligence agencies